John William Hind (born 19 June 1945) is an Anglo-Catholic theologian and former Bishop in Europe and Bishop of Chichester in the Church of England.

Early life and education
Hind was born in Watford, Hertfordshire, on 19 June 1945. He attended Watford Grammar School for Boys and went to Leeds University where he studied theology before teaching in a secondary school and a college of education. Hind trained for ordination at Cuddesdon College.

Ordained ministry
Hind was ordained in Southwark Cathedral in 1972. After parish ministry in the Diocese of Southwark; St John's Catford as a curate (1972–76) and Christ Church, Forest Hill as vicar (1976–82), Hind was appointed the Principal of Chichester Theological College in 1982.

Episcopal ministry
Hind became the area (and suffragan) Bishop of Horsham in the Chichester diocese in 1991 and in 1993 became the Bishop in Europe ("Bishop of Gibraltar in Europe" in full).

On the retirement of Eric Kemp in 2001 after 26 years as Bishop of Chichester, Hind succeeded him in the see which had included Wilfrid, Richard of Chichester, Lancelot Andrewes, and George Bell as its bishops.

In 2008 a priest in his diocese was convicted for historic child sex abuse, and a subsequent review by Baroness Butler-Sloss for the Church of England was critical of senior clergy for being slow to act on information available to them. In 2011 the Archbishop of Canterbury appointed an enquiry into the long running child protection issues in the diocese. The interim enquiry report found that there had been "an appalling history" over two decades of child protection problems, and many children had suffered hurt and damage. Because of concerns that safeguarding still remained dysfunctional, Lambeth Palace took over the oversight of clergy appointments and the protection of children and vulnerable adults in the diocese.

On 7 July 2011, Hind announced his intention to retire in April 2012. He duly retired effective 30 April 2012 – his suffragan Mark Sowerby became Acting Bishop of Chichester (since the senior suffragan in the diocese, Wallace Benn was involved with an ongoing investigation into diocesan safeguarding procedures) and his successor (Martin Warner, Bishop of Whitby) was announced three days later.

On 28 May 2012 Hind was licensed as an honorary assistant bishop in the Diocese of Portsmouth.

Views
Hind belongs to the traditionalist Anglo-Catholic wing of the Church of England.

Although the Diocese of Chichester includes the city of Brighton and Hove, which has a disproportionately high percentage gay population, Hind has a history of opposition to initiatives such as (and including) civil partnership. He has signed a petition organised by the Coalition for Marriage, opposing same-sex marriage.

Hind was also one of the bishops who signed a letter against Rowan Williams' decision not to block the appointment of Jeffrey John as Bishop of Reading in 2003, due to John being a self-identified homosexual. The other diocesan bishop signatories (referred to by their opponents, since there were nine, as the Nazgûl) were: Michael Scott-Joynt (Bishop of Winchester), Michael Langrish (Exeter), Michael Nazir-Ali (Rochester), Peter Forster (Chester), James Jones (Liverpool), George Cassidy (Southwell & Nottingham), Graham Dow (Carlisle) and David James (Bradford).

In October 2009, the Sunday Telegraph claimed that Hind had said that he would be happy to be reordained as a priest in the Roman Catholic Church and that divisions in Anglicanism could make it impossible for him to stay in the Church of England. In a statement published in response to this article, Hind stated that this "is not the case" and "that I would not be willing to deny the priesthood I have exercised hitherto."

Family
Hind is the elder son of Harold Hind (1915–97) and Joan Kemp (1918–76) and is married to Janet McLintock, a former social worker and Child protection Adviser for the Church of England and present Child Protection Adviser for the Diocese of Guildford. They have three children.

Styles
 John Hind Esq (1945–1972)
 The Revd John Hind (1972–1991)
 The Rt Revd John Hind (1991–2009)
 The Rt Revd Dr John Hind (2009–present)

References

1945 births
20th-century Church of England bishops
Alumni of Ripon College Cuddesdon
Alumni of the University of Leeds
20th-century Anglican bishops of Gibraltar
Anglo-Catholic bishops
Bishops of Chichester
Bishops of Horsham
Living people
People educated at Watford Grammar School for Boys
People from Watford
Principals of Chichester Theological College